Richard Newell Cooper (June 14, 1934 – December 23, 2020) was an American economist, policy adviser, and academic.

Born in Seattle, Cooper graduated from Oberlin College in 1956 and received a master's degree in economics from the London School of Economics and Political Science as a Marshall Scholar in 1958. He received his Ph.D. from Harvard University in 1962. Cooper was an assistant professor at Yale University from 1963 to 1966 and was Frank Altschul Professor of International Economics from 1966 to 1977. From 1972 to 1974 he served as provost.

Cooper served on the Council of Economic Advisers from 1961 to 1963 as the senior staff economist. Between 1965 and 1966, he served as Deputy Assistant Secretary of State for International Monetary Affairs in the United States Department of State, and between 1977 and 1981 he was the Under-Secretary of State for Economic Affairs. Cooper briefly served as acting Secretary of State under President Jimmy Carter for a few hours on May 3, 1980.

In 1981, Cooper became Maurits C. Boas Professor of International Economics at Harvard University. From 1990 to 1992, Cooper was the chairman of the Federal Reserve Bank of Boston. Between 1995 and 1997, he was the chairman of the National Intelligence Council.

References

External links 

 

|-

1934 births
2020 deaths
Acting United States Secretaries of State
Alumni of the London School of Economics
20th-century American economists
21st-century American economists
Harvard University alumni
Harvard University faculty
Oberlin College alumni
United States Council of Economic Advisers
United States Under Secretaries of State
Yale University faculty
Yale University staff
Fellows of the American Academy of Arts and Sciences
Peterson Institute for International Economics
People from Seattle